Beastie Girls is a 2017 South Korean drama film directed by Sin Ji-woo.

Cast
Go Eun-ah as Seo-hyeon
Yoo So-young as Ji-yeon 
Kim Seo-ji as Soo-jeong
Lee Jung-hyuk as Soo-hyeok 
Shin Min-chul as Kang-min
Jang Tae-seong as Seong-gyoo 
Ha Tae-seong as Woo-seok
Ryoo Seong-hyeon as Representative (special appearance)

References

External links
 

2017 films
South Korean drama films
2010s South Korean films